Joel Ayala Almeida (born 20 December 1946) is a Mexican politician affiliated with the PRI. He currently serves as Senator of the LXII Legislature of the Mexican Congress. He also served as Senator in the LVII and LIX Legislatures.

References

1946 births
Living people
Politicians from Sonora
Members of the Senate of the Republic (Mexico)
Institutional Revolutionary Party politicians
Members of the Chamber of Deputies (Mexico)
21st-century Mexican politicians
Members of the Constituent Assembly of Mexico City
People from San Luis Río Colorado
National Autonomous University of Mexico alumni
20th-century Mexican politicians
Deputies of the LX Legislature of Mexico